Al Safa is a locality in Dubai, United Arab Emirates (UAE).  Al Safa is located in western Dubai and is bordered to the north by Jumeirah, to the south by Al Quoz, to the east by Al Wasl, and to the west by Al Manara. Al Safa is bounded to the northwest and southwest by routes D 92 (Al Wasl Road) and E 11 (Sheikh Zayed Road) respectively.

Al Safa is a residential area; Interchange No. 2 (Pepsi Interchange) of Sheikh Zayed Road forms the southeastern periphery of the locality. Al Safa terminates at Interchange No. 3. Al Safa is divided into two subcommunities — Al Safa 1 and Al Safa 2, which house extremely affluent residential communities.  Important landmarks in Al Safa include Emirates English Speaking School, Jumeirah English Speaking School, Jumeirah Primary School and the consulate of China.

References 

Communities in Dubai